Linwood Elementary School can refer to:
Linwood Elementary School (California)
Linwood Elementary School (Kansas)
Linwood Elementary School (Georgia) 
Linwood Elementary School (Pennsylvania)